The 1955 Akron Zips football team was an American football team that represented the University of Akron in the Ohio Athletic Conference (OAC) during the 1955 college football season. In its second season under head coach Joe McMullen, the team compiled a 6–2 record (6-2 against OAC opponents) and outscored opponents by a total of 245 to 73. Mario Russo was the team captain. The team played its home games at the Rubber Bowl in Akron, Ohio.

Schedule

References

Akron
Akron Zips football seasons
Akron Zippers football